Roger Dorchy (born 5 September 1944) is a French former racing driver.

References

1944 births
Living people
French racing drivers
24 Hours of Le Mans drivers